Sejna and Šejna may refer to:

 Karel Šejna (1896, Zálezly - 1982), Czech conductor
 Jan Šejna (1927 - 1997), Czech-Czechoslovak general defected to the US in 1968 
 21985 Šejna, a main belt asteroid
 Marco Sejna (born 1972, West Berlin), a German footballer
 Peter Sejna (born 1979, Liptovský Mikuláš), Slovak ice hockey player
 Sejny in Poland

See also 
 Miloš Šejn
 Shein (Schein)
 Şeineanu (Şăineanu)
 Šajnović (Sajnovics)

Slovak-language surnames